Mihkel Janson (also Mihkel Jaanson; 1888 Viluvere Parish (now Põhja-Pärnumaa Parish), Kreis Pernau - ?) was an Estonian politician. He was a member of II Riigikogu. On 3 October 1925, he resigned his position and he was replaced by Alma Ostra-Oinas.

References

1888 births
Year of death missing
People from Põhja-Pärnumaa Parish
People from Kreis Pernau
Estonian Social Democratic Workers' Party politicians
Members of the Riigikogu, 1923–1926
Russian military personnel of World War I